Knezdol is a settlement in the Municipality of Trbovlje in central Slovenia. It is made up of clusters of settlement and isolated farmsteads dispersed though the hills north of the town of Trbovlje. The area is part of the traditional region of Styria. It is now included with the rest of the municipality in the Central Sava Statistical Region.

Name
Knezdol was first attested in written sources in 1265–67 as in Gravenstůl. The Slovene name is a compound of knez 'duke' and dol 'valley', a calque from the German compound grave 'count' + stuol 'seat'. The name indicates that the area was the property of a count or duke.

Mass grave
Knezdol is the site of a mass grave from the period immediately after the Second World War. Human remains were found during excavations in 1980 for a dining room at the lodge. The remains are believed to be those of victims brought to the site from Trbovlje and Hrastnik, and murdered in May and June 1945.

References

External links
 Knezdol on Geopedia
 

Populated places in the Municipality of Trbovlje